The 2021 NAB League Girls season was the fifth season of the NAB League Girls competition for under-19 female Australian rules footballers in Victoria. The season commenced on 6 February and concluded with the Grand Final on 16 May. The premiership was won by Oakleigh Chargers, who defeated Geelong Falcons in the Grand Final.

Format
The league consisted of 13 full-time teams (12 from Victoria and 1 from Tasmania) that competed in a nine-round regular season. There were also five academy teams that were to partake in some matches but were not eligible for finals (those teams were Sydney Swans Academy, GWS Giants Academy, Brisbane Lions Academy, Gold Coast Suns Academy and Northern Territory; though the Lions and Suns did not play any officially recognised matches). The finals series was determined via a conference system. The top four teams based in regional Victoria and Tasmania and top four teams from metropolitan Victoria (ie: Melbourne) competed in a top four finals system. The winners of the regional Victoria/Tasmania section and Victoria metro section played off for the premiership.

Ladder

Finals series

Elimination finals

Semi-finals

Grand Final

See also
 2021 NAB League Boys season

References

External links
 Season results (Australian Football)

NAB League
NAB League Girls
Nab League Girls